Marie Arena (born 17 December 1966) is a Belgian politician who has been serving as Member of the European Parliament (MEP) since 2014. She is a member of the Socialist Party, part of the Party of European Socialists.

Career in national politics
From 2000 to 2009, Arena held several ministerial functions in various regional and federal governments. From 2000 to 2003, she was Walloon Minister of Employment and Training. She then was Federal Minister of the Civil Service, Social Integration, Cities and Equal Opportunities in the second government of Prime Minister Guy Verhofstadt from 12 July 2003 to 20 July 2004. She was the Minister-President of the French Community of Belgium from July 2004 until March 2008. She then became Federal Minister for Social Integration, Pensions and Large Cities in the Leterme I Government, which took office on 20 March 2008. She held that office until 17 July 2009.

Member of the European Parliament
Since the 2014 European elections, Arena has been Member of the European Parliament. During her first term, she served on the Committee on International Trade (INTA), the Committee on Women's Rights and Gender Equality (FEMM), the delegation to the ACP–EU Joint Parliamentary Assembly and the delegation to the Parliamentary Assembly of the Union for the Mediterranean. Since the 2019 elections, she has been a member of the Committee on Foreign Affairs. In 2020, she also joined the Special Committee on Beating Cancer.

From 2019 to 2023, Arena chaired the Subcommittee on Human Rights. In this capacity, she was part of the Democracy Support and Election Coordination Group (DEG), which oversees the Parliament's election observation missions.

In addition to her committee assignments, Arena was a member of the European Parliament Intergroup on Cancer, the European Parliament Intergroup on Children's Rights, the European Parliament Intergroup on LGBT Rights and the Responsible Business Conduct Working Group.

Controversy
Amid the Qatars suspected corruption of the European Parliament, Arena's offices were searched in December 2022. She resigned her post as chair of the subcommittee on human rights on 11 January 2023, following allegations that she failed to declare a trip in May 2022 which had been paid for by the Qatari government.

Honours 
 : Grand Officer of the Order of Leopold (2010)

References

External links 

 Website

1966 births
Living people
Government ministers of Wallonia
Ministers-President of the French Community of Belgium
People from Mons
Belgian Ministers of State
Socialist Party (Belgium) MEPs
MEPs for Belgium 2014–2019
MEPs for Belgium 2019–2024
Grand Officers of the Order of Leopold II
21st-century women MEPs for Belgium
Women government ministers of Belgium
Women governors and heads of sub-national entities